The Mountain Meadows Massacre is a 2001 documentary film about the Mountain Meadows massacre. It was produced by Eric Young with Dave Chase, Jan Walker and Larinda Wenzel and distributed through The Studio, Inc.

Synopsis
The documentary includes interviews with historians, reenactments, and photographs to help tell all sides of the Mountain Meadows Massacre. It relies mainly on the research of Juanita Brooks, which is found in her book The Mountain Meadows Massacre.

See also
 Under the Banner of Heaven by Jon Krakauer

Notes

External links
 Official film website
 

Films about the Mountain Meadows Massacre
Documentary films about United States history
Documentary films about Mormonism
2001 films
American documentary films
2001 documentary films
2000s English-language films
2000s American films